Björgvin Helgi Halldórsson (alternate names: Bo Halldórsson, Björgvin Halldórsson or Bo Hall) (born 16 April 1951) is an Icelandic pop singer from Hafnarfjörður. He represented Iceland in the Eurovision Song Contest 1995 with the song Núna (English: Now), ranked in 15th place with 31 points.

Björgvin performed with Sigrún Hjálmtýsdóttir, amongst others, and released several solo albums.

Björgvin took part in several TV shows.

Life
Björgvin was born on 16 April 1951. His daughter Svala is a pop singer, and was Iceland's representative in the Eurovision Song Contest 2017.

Discography

Albums
This is a selective list of albums by Björgvin.

 Þó líði ár og öld (1969)	
 Ég syng fyrir þig (1978)	
 Jólagestir (1987)
 Allir fá þá eitthvað fallegt (1989)
 Jólagestir 2 (1989)
 Yrkjum Ísland (smáskífa) (1994)
 Þó líði ár og öld (1994)
 Núna / If it's gonna end in heartache (1995)
 Núna (1995)
 Jólagestir 3 (1995)
 Alla leið heim (1997)
 Bestu jólalög Björgvins (1999) 	
 Um jólin (2000)
 Á hverju kvöldi (2000)
 Eftirlýstur (2001)
 Ég tala um þig (2002)
 Brúðarskórnir (2003)
 Duet (2003)
 Manstu það (smáskífa) (2005)
 Ár og öld (2005)	
 Björgvin ásamt Sinfóníuhljómsveit Íslands & gestum (2006)
 Björgvin (2006)
 Jólagestir 4 (2007)
 Jólagestir Björgvins í Höllinni 2008 (2008)
 Duet II / Duet II (Deluxe) (2010) 
 Gullvagninn (2011)
 Duet 3 (2013) (with Jón Jónsson)

Singles
(Selective)
 "Núna" / "If It's Gonna End in Heartache" (1995) 
 "Ást er æði" (2013)
 "Kæri vinur" (duet with Jón Jónsson) (2014)

References

Further reading
 Gisli Runar Jonsson: Bo & Co, Reykjavík, (2001),

External links
 
 Interview on the German radiostation "Radio 700" April 2007  partly
 Interview on the German radiostation "Radio 700" Winter 2007  partly
 www.tonlist.com, biography of Björgvin Halldórsson

1951 births
Living people

Bjorgvin Halldorsson

Bjorgvin Halldorsson
Eurovision Song Contest entrants of 1995
21st-century Icelandic male singers